Sivaelurus is an extinct genus of felid. The type and only species, S. chinjiensis, was described based on a fragmentary fossil found in Asia. It was originally described as Pseudaelurus chinjiensis in 1910, but was reassigned to a new genus in 1915.

A 2020 study of newfound material from the region suggested that the species Miopanthera lorteti be reassigned to this genus; it also described fragmentary material referable to Sivaelurus sp.

References

Prehistoric felids
Fossil taxa described in 1915
Prehistoric carnivoran genera